Karel Kolář (16 December 1955 – 4 October 2017) was a 400 metres runner from the Czech Republic, who represented Czechoslovakia. He won two medals at the European Indoor Championships and two at the 1978 European Championships. He established the Indoor World record  (400 m / 46.21 sec) at European Indoor Championships in Vienna.

Achievements

References

1955 births
2017 deaths
Athletes (track and field) at the 1980 Summer Olympics
Czech male sprinters
Czechoslovak male sprinters
Olympic athletes of Czechoslovakia
European Athletics Championships medalists
People from Jindřichův Hradec
Sportspeople from the South Bohemian Region